The Edinburgh Courant was a broadsheet newspaper from the 18th century. It was published out of Edinburgh, Midlothian, Scotland. Its first issue was dated February 14–19, 1705 and was sold for a penny. It was Scotland's first regional newspaper and it was produced twice weekly for five years, thereafter continuing as the Scots Courant until April 1720.

History
The paper was first printed in 1705 by James Watson printer but only 55 copies were issued. In 1706 it briefly continued under the name "Scots Courant" before becoming dormant.

In 1718, the Edinburgh Evening Courant began publication, as an evening newspaper, being first printed by James MacEwan,  or McQueen or McEwen on the High street section of the Royal Mile, published three times per week as a Whig publication in opposition to the Jacobite paper the Caledonian Mercury. passing to his protege, Alexander Kincaid in 1735. It survived until the Edinburgh Evening News came into existence in 1873.

It was founded by James Watson (who had also published the Edinburgh Gazette from 1700) and had its main printing office was at Craigs Close at 170 High Street on the Royal Mile, the premises generally being known as the King's Printing House.

In 1725, during the time of the Scottish Malt Tax riots, rival political factions used – or at least attempted to use – newspapers including the Edinburgh Evening Courant and the Caledonian Mercury as their "mouthpieces", as a letter from the then book trade apprentice Andrew Millar indicates. Millar was apprenticed to James McEuen, who had been printer, editor, and principal bookseller of The Edinburgh Evening Courant since 1718.

Editors
Daniel Defoe, author of the 1719 novel Robinson Crusoe, and then based at Moubray House, was its editor in the early 18th century.
James Hannay, Naval History writer, was its editor from 1860 to 1864.

Archives
Images of the newspaper for two years (1750 and 1884) have been digitalized and can be viewed through Find my Past and Ancestry.com, respectively with a subscription. Microfiche copies of all surviving copies are available for inspection free of charge at the Edinburgh City Library (by appointment).

References

External links
Concise History of British Newspapers
The Word of the Street
Ancestry.com 
The Scotsman
The Hannays of Knock and Garrarie

1705 establishments in Scotland
1873 disestablishments in Scotland
Publications established in 1705
Publications disestablished in 1873
Defunct newspapers published in the United Kingdom
Mass media in Edinburgh
History of Edinburgh